Kalateh-ye Molla (also Romanized as Kalāteh-ye Mollā and Kalāteh Mollā) is a village in Damankuh Rural District, in the Central District of Damghan County, Semnan Province, Iran. At the 2006 census, its population was 517, in 164 families.

References 

Populated places in Damghan County